Bruno Brodniewicz (also spelled Brodniewitsch) born 22 July 1895 in Posen, was a German prisoner in the Auschwitz concentration camp. Brodniewicz was the first Lagerälteste (camp elder), carrying prisoner tag number 1. He died in April 15–16, 1945 in Bergen-Belsen concentration camp.

Life

As a convicted criminal Brodniewicz was transferred to a concentration camp during the late summer of 1934.  He was held temporarily in the Lichtenburg concentration camp. Brodniewicz was one of the first 30 prisoners, defined as the so-called 'professional criminals', who, on 20 May 1940 accompanied by the roll call officer Gerhard Palitzsch from the Sachsenhausen concentration camp were taken to the newly established concentration camp at Auschwitz.

Brodniewicz was the first camp elder of the main camp of Auschwitz and remained in this position until 1942. He wore prisoner tag number 1 and was considered "Black Death" (Czarna śmierć) in the camp. As one of the "Greens" (so-called because their uniforms bore the green triangle identifying them as criminal prisoners), Brodniewicz was considered relentlessly brutal and is believed to have been responsible for the deaths of many fellow inmates. He decisively influenced the camp atmosphere in what was to become a reign of terror. Brodniewicz had illegally hidden gold and other valuables in his parlour, which the SS found after fellow inmate Otto Küsel (inmate No. 2) tipped them off. Brodniewicz was then sent to the punishment bunker in late December 1942 or early January 1943 and was replaced as the camp elder.

Brodniewicz then became camp elder in the Gypsy camp at Auschwitz, in June 1943 in the Jaworzno concentration camp, a sub-camp of Auschwitz.  From April 1944 he was held in the satellite camp Eintrachthütte, then from September 1944 in the satellite camp Bismarckhütte. After Auschwitz was evacuated in January 1945, Brodniewicz was transferred to the Woffleben subcamp, where he also held the position of camp elder. He was last held in the Bergen-Belsen concentration camp.  After the Bergen-Belsen camp was liberated on 15 April 1945, he and other functionaries was presumably lynched by fellow inmates for his crimes.

Literature

 Hermann Langbein: People in Auschwitz. Univ. of North Carolina Press, 26 April 2004 
 Hermann Langbein: People in Auschwitz. Frankfurt am Main 1980
 Reni Rieger: Emil Bednarek - prisoner in Auschwitz . Grin Verlag 2008
 Wolfgang Benz, Barbara Distel (ed.): The place of terror. History of the Nazi concentration camps. Volume 5: Hinzert, Auschwitz, Neuengamme. CH Beck, Munich 2007, .
 Till Bastian: Auschwitz and the 'Auschwitz Lie' mass murder and falsification of history. CH Beck 1997,

References

External links
 "Prisoner photograph of Bruno Brodniewicz''

Auschwitz concentration camp prisoners
Sachsenhausen concentration camp prisoners
Mittelbau-Dora concentration camp personnel
20th-century German criminals
1895 births
1945 deaths
People from Poznań
People from the Province of Posen
German people who died in Bergen-Belsen concentration camp
Male murder victims
Polish people who died in Bergen-Belsen concentration camp
Kapos (concentration camp)